Gordi 2 is the second studio album released by Yugoslav rock band Gordi, released in 1979.

Gordi 2 is the band's last album to feature drummer Stevan Milutinović.

The closing track on the album, instrumental "Uspavanka" ("Lullaby"), was dedicated to Gordi leader Zlatko Manojlović's son Miloš.

Track listing
All songs written by Zlatko Manojlović.

Personnel
Zlatko Manojlović – vocals, guitar, producer
Goran Manojlović – keyboard, flute, vocals (on track 4)
Slobodan Svrdlan – bass guitar
Stevan Milutinović – drums, percussion, vocals (on track 7)

Additional personnel
Petar Gaković - engineer
Milenko Miletić - graphic design
Milan Đurica - photograph

References 

Gordi 2 at Discogs

External links
Gordi 2 at Discogs

Gordi (band) albums
1979 albums
PGP-RTB albums